The 2011–12 season was the 85th season of competitive association football in the Football League played by Cardiff City Football Club. After suffering defeat in the Championship play-off semi-finals to Reading the previous year, Cardiff competed in the second tier of English football for the eighth consecutive year. The season covers the period between 1 July 2011 and 30 June 2012.

Malky Mackay was appointed manager at the start of the season and signed 9 players in the summer transfer window ahead of his first season in charge of the club. Cardiff occupied a place in the play-offs for the majority of the season and eventually finished the regular season in sixth position. During the season, Cardiff reached the Football League Cup final, however their first final in the competition ended in defeat against Liverpool.

Background and pre-season

At the end of the 2010–11 season, following a second consecutive defeat in the play-offs, manager Dave Jones was sacked from his position after an end of season review into the club's performance. At the time of his departure, Jones was the longest serving manager in the Championship having held his post since May 2005. The club held talks with former England and Newcastle United captain Alan Shearer to replace Jones but he rejected the job despite stating that he was impressed with the "vision, ambition and determination of the owner Dato Chan Tien Ghee and the board". The Bluebirds instead approached Championship rivals Watford for permission to speak to their manager Malky Mackay, which was initially rejected. However, after the two clubs agreed a compensation fee, Mackay was officially appointed as Dave Jones' replacement on 17 June on a three-year contract. Mackay set about reshaping his coaching staff, allowing assistant manager Terry Burton, first-team coach Paul Wilkinson and fitness coach Alex Armstrong to leave the club, before appointing David Kerslake, Joe McBride and Richard Collinge as their replacements. Goalkeeping coach Martyn Margetson later also left the club to take up the same position at Premier League side West Ham United. Cardiff also appointed Mackay's former Watford colleague Iain Moody as their new head of recruitment.

Players released at the end of the season were Martin John and Gavin Rae, while Jay Bothroyd and Chris Burke also left the club after failing to agree new deals. Adam Matthews departed on a free transfer to Scottish side Celtic, having agreed a pre-contract agreement in February 2011, and striker Michael Chopra was sold to Ipswich Town. During the summer transfer window, Mackay agreed deals to sign free agents Craig Conway, Don Cowie, Robert Earnshaw, Rudy Gestede, Aron Gunnarsson and Andrew Taylor. The club also completed transfers for Joe Mason, for £250,000, Kenny Miller, for a reported £870,000, as well as signing Slovakian midfielder Filip Kiss on a season-long loan deal from Slovan Bratislava.

Preseason fixtures

Review

August–September

The opening game of the 2011–12 Football League Championship season saw Cardiff travel to West Ham United, who had been relegated from the Premier League the previous year, with debutant striker Kenny Miller scoring the only goal of the game in the 91st minute to secure a victory for Cardiff. In the following match, the club progressed through to the second round of the Football League Cup after defeating League Two side Oxford United 3–1 in extra-time. The team continued their winning start to the campaign in their first home tie, defeating Bristol City in the first Severnside derby match of the season. Three days later, on 17 August, Cardiff suffered their first defeat of the season, losing 3–1 to Brighton & Hove Albion. Cardiff ended August with two successive away draws in matches against Burnley and Portsmouth and advanced to the third round of the League Cup after a 5–3 victory over Huddersfield Town. On the final day of the summer transfer window, Coventry City defender Ben Turner completed a transfer to the club. As part of the deal, Cardiff striker Jon Parkin had been expected to move to Coventry but, after he failed to agree terms, the move subsequently collapsed, Turner joining Cardiff in a cash-only deal for a fee of £750,000.

At the start of September, prior to an international fixture break, a club record 10 players were called up for international duty by their respective countries. Due to a close affiliation with the country, Malaysian international Safee Sali attended a two-week trial at the club. Cardiff played their first match of the month on 10 September, defeating Doncaster Rovers 2–0 after goals from Anthony Gerrard and Robert Earnshaw. In the following match, a 1–1 draw with Blackpool, Cardiff recorded their third consecutive away draw after Don Cowie had initially given them the lead. Three home matches at the Cardiff City Stadium, a 0–0 draw and a League Cup penalty shoot-out victory over Leicester City and a 2–1 victory over Southampton, ensured Cardiff finished the month of September unbeaten. Striker Jon Parkin left the club on an initial one-month loan move to fellow Championship side Doncaster Rovers and goalkeeper Elliot Parish joined Cardiff from Aston Villa on a loan deal set to last until January 2012.

October–November
Cardiff suffered their first defeat since mid-August on 1 October, losing 2–1 to Hull City. Youth team graduate Joe Ralls scored the Bluebirds only goal of the game with a volley that was described as "spectacular" in his league debut. Following a two-week international break, Cardiff recorded a 2–2 draw with Ipswich Town, Peter Whittingham equalising from a penalty after Ipswich had taken the lead through former Cardiff player Michael Chopra who had been sold to the club three months earlier. Their following two matches saw a total of 15 goals as Cardiff suffered a 4–3 defeat away to Peterborough United on 18 October before recovering with a 5–3 victory over Barnsley four days later. On the same day as their victory over Barnsley, Chief Executive Gethin Jenkins stepped down from his position on the board. Cardiff defeated Burnley 1–0 in the fourth round of the League Cup following a goal from Joe Mason, reaching the quarter-finals of the League Cup for only the second time in the club's history. In their final match in October, Cardiff drew 1–1 with Leeds United, Mason netting for the third consecutive match.

Cardiff began the month of November with two wins in the space of three days, defeating Derby County and Crystal Palace 3–0 and 2–0 respectively, elevating the team into the play-off places for the first time since the end of September. Following an extended break due to international fixtures, Cardiff recorded a 2–1 win over Reading after goals from Peter Whittingham and captain Mark Hudson. A second Malaysian international, national team captain Safiq Rahim, attended a three-week trial with the club. Rahim had originally been invited on a trial with his teammate Sali in August but was only able to attend in November. Cardiff drew 1–1 with Coventry City on 22 November, having gone ahead from a Peter Whittigham goal, before beating Nottingham Forest 1–0 in their final league game of the month, ending November unbeaten having won four and drawn one league match, a run of form that saw manager Mackay awarded the November Championship manager of the month award. Defender Dekel Keinan left the club on loan to join Crystal Palace on an initial six-week loan deal and Jon Parkin completed his second loan deal of the season by joining Huddersfield Town until January. On 29 November, Cardiff defeated Blackburn Rovers 2–0 in the quarter-final of the League Cup, reaching the semi-final of the competition for the first time since the 1965–66 season.

December–January
A goal from Kenny Miller secured a 1–0 victory over Birmingham City on 4 December as Cardiff continued their good form, reaching third place in the Championship table, and a 0–0 draw with Millwall saw the side record their ninth consecutive league match without a defeat. One week later, their unbeaten run came to an end as they suffered a 3–2 defeat at home to Middlesbrough, the team's first defeat since 18 October. A late own-goal by Watford defender Adrian Mariappa rescued a 1–1 draw for Cardiff to avoid a second defeat in a row on 26 December in manager Malky Mackay's first match against his former side. Cardiff eventually recorded their first league win since the start of December with a 1–0 victory over Nottingham Forest following a goal from Miller, ending 2011 in fourth position.

The club's first match of 2012 ended in a 3–1 victory over Reading following goals from Miller, Mason and Aron Gunnarsson. With the winter transfer window opening at the start of January, Cardiff completed their first signing with Elliot Parish joining the club on a permanent basis having been on loan since September. In the third round of the FA Cup, Cardiff were knocked out of the competition by Premier League side West Bromwich Albion after suffering a 4–2 defeat. On the same day, Cardiff saw a £400,000 bid rejected by Brighton & Hove Albion for winger Craig Noone. Three days later, Cardiff played the first leg of the League Cup semi-final against fellow Championship side Crystal Palace, losing 1–0 at Selhurst Park. Cardiff returned to league action for the first time in two weeks with a 0–0 draw with Doncaster Rovers on 14 January. Cypriot investment banker Mehmet Dalman joined the board, replacing U-Jiun Tan as a director. Cardiff failed in a second attempt to sign a winger after Blackpool rejected a £800,000 bid for Matt Phillips. In the club's last two league matches in January, they recorded a 3–2 victory over Portsmouth and a 1–1 draw with Southampton. On 24 January, in the second leg of the League Cup semi-final, Cardiff defeated Crystal Palace 1–0, following an own-goal from Palace defender Anthony Gardner, leaving the tie at 1–1 after extra-time, resulting in a penalty shoot-out. Cardiff goalkeeper Tom Heaton saved two penalties and Palace's Jonathan Parr missed his penalty to give Cardiff a 3–1 shoot-out victory, Miller the only Cardiff player to fail to score his penalty, reaching the first League Cup final for in the club's history.

In the closing days of the winter transfer window, Cardiff completed their second transfer, signing winger Kadeem Harris from League Two side Wycombe Wanderers for an undisclosed fee and allowed Hungarian defender Gábor Gyepes to leave the club after his contract was cancelled by mutual consent. Jon Parkin left the club for a third time during the season on loan, joining Scunthorpe United, and Solomon Taiwo completed a loan move to Leyton Orient.

February–March

Having not lost a game since 17 December, Cardiff opened February with two defeats, losing 3–1 at home against Blackpool, after conceding three goals in the final 11 minutes of the match, and 2–1 to Leicester City, the first time during the season that Cardiff had suffered consecutive defeats. A 3–1 victory over Peterborough United in their following match saw Cardiff briefly return to third place, before a third league defeat of the month against Ipswich Town dropped them back into fourth. Despite suffering 3 defeats in their previous 4 matches, Malky Mackay was handed a three and a half-year contract extension, keeping him at the club till June 2016. On 26 February 2012, Cardiff played Premier League side Liverpool in the 2012 Football League Cup Final at Wembley Stadium, the first League Cup final in the club's history. The Bluebirds took a surprise lead in the opening 20 minutes through Joe Mason but a second-half goal from Liverpool defender Martin Škrtel took the tie into extra-time after 90 minutes. Dirk Kuyt gave Liverpool a 2–1 lead in the 18th minute of extra-time but pressure from Cardiff saw Ben Turner score a late equaliser with two minutes left of the match to take the game to a penalty shoot-out. After 4 penalties for either side, the shoot-out stood at 2–2 before Glen Johnson gave Liverpool the advantage by converting his penalty. Cardiff defender Anthony Gerrard took the final penalty for Cardiff, needing to score to avoid defeat, but hit his penalty over the bar to hand victory to Liverpool. Despite suffering defeat, Mackay stated that the Cardiff players' performance had "done the club proud".

At the start of March, Cardiff returned to league competition, losing 2–0 to West Ham United, suffering consecutive league defeats for the second time in the space of one month and dropping out of the Championship play-off places for the first time since November 2011. A late goal from Sam Vokes saw Cardiff draw 2–2 with Brighton & Hove Albion in their next match, having led 2–1 going into the final stages of the game. Cardiff claimed a second Severnside derby victory of the season in the following match, beating Bristol City 2–1 with both goals coming from own goals scored by Bristol players. After a defeat to Hull City, Cardiff embarked on run of four consecutive draws, three of which came at home, that left them outside the play-off places in eighth position.

April–May

Entering April with a four match unbeaten streak, Cardiff continued their form, avoiding defeat in the remaining six matches of the season. This included victories over Middlesbrough, Barnsley, Derby County and Crystal Palace to finish the season in sixth position, securing the final spot in the Championship play-offs. Cardiff were drawn against West Ham, who had finished the season in third position, in the play-off semi-finals. Two goals from Jack Collison gave West Ham a 2–0 advantage in the first-leg and Cardiff were unable to mount a comeback in the second-leg, suffering a 3–0 defeat to lose the semi-final 5–0 on aggregate.

Football League Championship

Standings

Result round by round

Kit

|
|
|
|
|
|
|
|
|

Squad

Statistics

|-
|colspan="14"|Players currently out on loan:

|-
|colspan="14"|Players featured for club who have left:

|}

Starting XI
The following players have been named in the most starting line-ups. This line-up may differ from the list of players with most appearances.

Captains

Goals & Assist record

Disciplinary record

Suspensions served

Key:
(H) = League Home, (A) = League Away, (FA) = FA Cup, (CC) = League Cup

International call-ups

Contracts

Transfers

In

 Total spending:  ~ £2,370,000

Notes
1Despite being a free transfer, Cardiff paid £350,000 compensation fee for Gunnarsson because he is under 24.
2Although officially undisclosed, BBC Sport reported the fee to be around £250,000.
3Although officially undisclosed, South Wales Echo reported the fee to be £750,000.
4Although officially undisclosed, South Wales Echo reported the fee to be around £150,000.

Loans in

Out

 Total income:  ~ £1,000,000

Notes 1The fee was officially believed to be £1.5 million, Ipswich Town manager Paul Jewell revealed the fee to be £1 million.

Loans out

Fixtures and results

Championship

Championship play-offs

FA Cup

League Cup

Overall summary

Summary

Score overview

Honours

 Club
Football League Cup Runners up

 Individual
Football League Championship Manager of the Month:
 November – Malky Mackay

 Football League Awards
Football League Player of the Year: Peter Whittingham (nominated)
Football League Goal of  the Year: Peter Whittingham's goal vs Barnsley, 13 March 2011

End-of-season awards

Source: South Wales Echo

References

External links
 
 
 

2011-12
2011–12 Football League Championship by team
Welsh football clubs 2011–12 season